Coplestone may refer to:

Edward Coplestone (1776–1849), English churchman and academic
John Coplestone, D.D. (1623–1689), English priest and academic
Thomas Coplestone (1688–1748), British landowner, Whig politician and MP
Michael William Coplestone Dillon Onslow (1938–2011), British Conservative politician
Coplestone Bampfylde (disambiguation), several people

See also
Copleston (disambiguation)
Copplestone